Charles Ellis Cross (born November 25, 2000) is an American football offensive tackle for the Seattle Seahawks of the National Football League (NFL). He played college football at Mississippi State and was selected ninth overall by the Seahawks in the 2022 NFL Draft.

Early life and high school
Cross was born on November 25, 2000, and grew up in Laurel, Mississippi, where he attended Laurel High School. Cross initially committed to play college football at Florida State. Cross decommitted from Florida State during his senior season in favor of signing with Mississippi State. He played in the 2018 All-American Bowl as a senior.

College career
Cross redshirted his true freshman season at Mississippi State after appearing in three games. He was named the Bulldogs' starting left tackle going into his redshirt freshman season. Cross started 10 games and was named to the Southeastern Conference All-Freshman team at the end of the season. Cross entered his redshirt sophomore season as one of the top offensive tackle prospects for the 2022 NFL Draft and was a preseason second-team All-SEC selection. He declared for the 2022 NFL Draft following the season.

Professional career

Cross was drafted ninth overall in the first round by the Seattle Seahawks in the 2022 NFL Draft. The Seahawks used the first-round selection that was acquired in the trade that sent Russell Wilson to the Denver Broncos. Acting as his own agent, Cross signed his four-year rookie contract with the team on June 2, 2022. As a rookie, Cross appeared in and started all 17 regular season games and one playoff game for the Seahawks in the 2022 season.

References

External links 
 
 Seattle Seahawks bio
 Mississippi State Bulldogs bio

2000 births
Living people
American football offensive tackles
Mississippi State Bulldogs football players
People from Laurel, Mississippi
Players of American football from Mississippi
All-American college football players
Seattle Seahawks players